The 2014–15 Stuttgarter Kickers season is the 115th season in the club's football history. In 3. Liga the club plays in the 3. Liga, the third tier of German football. The club also plays in the DFB-Pokal, it is the club's first season back in the DFB-Pokal since 2006. The club also takes part in the 2014–15 edition of the Württemberg Cup.

Background

Transfers & contracts

In

Out

Contracts

Matches

Legend

Friendly matches

1.Times in Central European Time/Central European Summer Time
2.Kickers goals listed first.

3. Liga

League fixtures and results

Table

League table

Summary table

DFB-Pokal

Württemberg Cup

Team statistics

Squad information

Squad and statistics

 Amar Cekic and Daniel Lang had no professional contract, they usually played at Stuttgarter Kickers II.

Top scorers

Penalties

All competitions

3. Liga

|-
|()* = Penalties saved
|- align="left" style="background:#DCDCDC"
| colspan="12"|Last updated: 18 May 2015
|-

Clean sheets

Multi–goal matches

Overview of statistics

Discipline

Cards

Suspensions

Team kit

Reserve team
Kickers' reserve team played in the Oberliga Baden-Württemberg and the coach was Jürgen Hartmann.

Technical staff

Notes
3.Redl, Leutenecker, Fennell, Stein, Baumgärtel, Halimi, Marchese, Braun, G. Müller, Soriano, Edwini-Bonsu, Badiane, Calamita
7.Redl, Leutenecker, Fennell, Stein, Baumgärtel, Halimi, Marchese, Braun, G. Müller, Soriano, Edwini-Bonsu

Sources

Match reports

Other sources

External links
 2014–15 Stuttgarter Kickers season at Kickersarchiv.de 
 2014–15 Stuttgarter Kickers season at Weltfussball.de 
 2014–15 Stuttgarter Kickers season at kicker.de 
 2014–15 Stuttgarter Kickers season at Fussballdaten.de 

Stuttgarter Kickers
Stuttgarter Kickers seasons